Brown Bluff is a basalt tuya on the Tabarin Peninsula of northern Antarctica. It formed in the last 1 million years as a result of subglacial eruptions within an englacial lake. Brown Bluff is divided into four stages: pillow volcano, tuff cone, slope failure, and hyaloclastite delta; and into five structural units.

The volcano gets its name from its steep slopes and brown-to-black hyaloclastite. It was applied by the Falklands Islands Dependencies Survey following their survey in 1946.

Environment

Topography
Brown Bluff has a  cobble and ash beach rising increasingly steeply towards towering red-brown tuff cliffs embedded with bombs and tephra. The cliffs are heavily eroded, resulting in loose scree and rock falls on higher slopes, and large, wind-eroded boulders on the beach. Permanent ice and tidewater glaciers surround the site to the north and south, occasionally filling the beach with brash ice.

Flora and fauna
Mosses occur at higher elevations near glacial drainage.

The site has been identified as an Important Bird Area (IBA) by BirdLife International because it supports a breeding colony of about 20,000 pairs of Adélie penguins, as well as about 550 pairs of gentoo penguins. Other birds nesting there include cape petrels, Wilson's storm petrels and kelp gulls. Weddell seals regularly haul out, and leopard seals often hunt offshore.

Geology
Brown Bluff is a  cliff of volcanic rocks consisting of a tuya or moberg, which is a volcano erupted under an icecap. The base layer is breccia formed by violent phreatic eruptions under the lake formed in the ice cap by the magmatic heat. The middle yellow layers are palagonite weathering of steeply dipping ash layers. The top caprock is composed of black layers are basalt flows that erupted after the meltwater lake drained away, resulting in subaerial lava flows.

References

External links

Secretariat of the Antarctic Treaty Visitor Guidelines and site description

Tuyas of Antarctica
Volcanoes of Graham Land
Landforms of Trinity Peninsula
Important Bird Areas of Antarctica
Seabird colonies
Pleistocene volcanoes
Penguin colonies